Stefanie Lucia Mariëlle Luiken (born 16 May 1985) is a Dutch former backstroke swimmer. She participated in the 2004 Summer Olympics and finished sixth with the Dutch 4×100 m medley relay team. She won a bronze medal at the 2004 European Aquatics Championships in the same event.

Luiken was born in Nijmegen, but later moved to Eindhoven to train at the Philips Sport Vereniging club. She won four national titles in backstroke: 50 m and 100 m in 2003 (25 m pool) and 100 m in 2004–2005. While preparing for the 2008 Olympics, she decided to retire from competitive swimming in March 2008.

References

External links
 

1985 births
Living people
Dutch female backstroke swimmers
Olympic swimmers of the Netherlands
Swimmers at the 2004 Summer Olympics
Sportspeople from Nijmegen
European Aquatics Championships medalists in swimming
21st-century Dutch women